Ander Olaizola Agirre (born July 24, 1989) is a Spanish footballer who plays for SD Beasain as a midfielder.

External links

1989 births
Living people
Spanish footballers
Footballers from the Basque Country (autonomous community)
Association football midfielders
SD Eibar footballers
Barakaldo CF footballers
Atlético Levante UD players
SD Beasain footballers
People from Zarautz
Sportspeople from Gipuzkoa